Thanasi Kokkinakis and Jordan Thompson were the defending champions, but Kokkinakis chose to compete in the Hopman Cup instead. Thompson played alongside Lleyton Hewitt, but lost in the first round to Grigor Dimitrov and Ryan Harrison.

Henri Kontinen and John Peers won the title, defeating Leonardo Mayer and Horacio Zeballos in the final, 3–6, 6–3, [10–2].

Seeds

Draw

Draw

References
 Main Draw

Brisbane International - Doubles
Men's Singles